Thomaz Bellucci and Bruno Soares were the defending champions; however, they didn't play this year.
Brian Dabul and Leonardo Mayer defeated 6–4, 7–6(6) Johan Brunström and Jean-Julien Rojer in the final.

Seeds

Draw

Draw

External Links
 Doubles Draw

Tunis Open - Doubles
2009 Doubles